VEH, Veh, or Veh. may refer to:

 Vectored Exception Handling (VEH), one of the Microsoft systems for exception handling
 Ve (Arabic), a character of the Arabic alphabet
 An abbreviation for vehicle